The 2020 UEFA European Football Championship, commonly referred to as UEFA Euro 2020 (stylised as UEFA EURO 2020) or simply Euro 2020, was the 16th UEFA European Championship, the quadrennial international men's football championship of Europe organised by the Union of European Football Associations (UEFA). To celebrate the 60th anniversary of the European Championship competition, UEFA president Michel Platini declared that the tournament would be hosted in several nations as a "romantic" one-off event, with 11 cities in 11 UEFA countries each providing venues for the tournament. Defending champions Portugal, who won UEFA Euro 2016 in France, were eliminated in the round of 16 by Belgium. Italy won their second European Championship title by beating England on penalties in the final following a 1–1 draw after extra time. The win came exactly on the 39th anniversary of Italy's 1982 FIFA World Cup Final win over West Germany.

The tournament was originally intended to be played between 12 June and 12 July 2020. However, due to the COVID-19 pandemic in Europe during that year, the tournament was postponed to June and July 2021, while retaining the name UEFA Euro 2020 and host venues. Alongside special rules regarding COVID-19, UEFA also allowed two extra substitutions and implemented video assistant referee (VAR) for the first time.

Initially, there were 13 venues chosen for the tournament but two were later dropped. Brussels was dropped in December 2017 after the city's Eurostadium was abandoned, while Dublin was dropped in April 2021 because there was no guarantee that spectators could attend. Spain originally intended to use Bilbao as a host venue but later changed it to Seville to allow for spectators at matches. UEFA chose Stadio Olimpico in Rome to host the opening match between Italy and Turkey, while Wembley Stadium in London was selected as a semi-final and final venue for the second time, following the 1996 tournament at the original stadium of the same name.

The tournament was well received by fans and commentators, with the most goals per game in a European Championship since the introduction of the group stage, and only two goalless games. The refereeing style was also praised, with a conservative use of VAR and quick decisions made on the pitch.

Bid process

While some countries such as Belgium, Bulgaria and Romania, Germany, Hungary and Romania, Ireland, Scotland, and Wales, the Netherlands, and Turkey had already expressed an interest in bidding to host the tournament, then-UEFA president Michel Platini suggested at a press conference on 30 June 2012, a day before the UEFA Euro 2012 Final, that instead of having one host country, or joint hosting by multiple countries, the tournament could be spread over "12 or 13 cities" across the continent, as was done for the UEFA European Under-17 Championship's elite round, where each of the seven groups was hosted by a different country.

European format decision
On 6 December 2012, UEFA announced the tournament would be held in multiple cities across Europe to mark the 60th anniversary of the tournament. The selection of the host cities did not guarantee an automatic qualifying berth to the national team of that country. UEFA reasoned that the pan-European staging of the tournament was the logical decision at a time of financial difficulty, such as the European debt crisis. Reaction to UEFA's plan was mixed across Europe. Critics cited the expanded format (from 31 matches featuring 16 nations to 51 featuring 24) and its associated additional costs as the decisive factor for only one nation (Turkey) having put forward a serious bid.

Bidding venues
The final list of bids was published by UEFA on 26 April 2014, with a decision on the hosts being made by the UEFA Executive Committee on 19 September 2014. There were two bids for the Finals Package (of which one was successful, marked with dark green for semi-finals and final) and 19 bids for the Standard Package (of which 12 were initially successful, marked with light green for quarter-finals and group stage, and yellow for round of 16 and group stage); Brussels, marked with red, were initially selected but removed from the list of venues by UEFA on 7 December 2017. Dublin, marked in red, was initially selected but removed from the list of venues by UEFA on 23 April 2021. On the same day, UEFA also announced the matches in Spain would be moved from Bilbao to Seville.

Effects of the COVID-19 pandemic

Start of the pandemic and postponement
In early 2020, the COVID-19 pandemic in Europe triggered concerns regarding its potential impact on players, staff and visitors to the twelve host cities of the tournament. At the UEFA Congress in early March, UEFA president Aleksander Čeferin said the organisation was confident that the situation could be dealt with, while general secretary Theodore Theodoridis stated that UEFA was maintaining contact with the World Health Organization and national governments regarding the coronavirus. The impact on football grew later that month, as numerous domestic and UEFA competition matches began taking place behind closed doors. By 13 March 2020, upcoming UEFA competition fixtures were postponed, while major European leagues were suspended, including the Bundesliga, La Liga, Ligue 1, Premier League, and Serie A.

UEFA held a videoconference on 17 March 2020 with representatives of its 55 member associations, along with a FIFPro representative and the boards of the European Club Association and European Leagues, to discuss the response to the outbreak for domestic and European competitions, including Euro 2020. At the meeting, UEFA announced that the tournament would be postponed to the following year, proposing that it take place from 11 June to 11 July 2021. The postponement allowed for pressure to be reduced on the public services in affected countries, while also providing space in the calendar for domestic European leagues that had been suspended to complete their seasons. On the following day, the Bureau of the FIFA Council approved the date change in the FIFA International Match Calendar. As a result, the expanded FIFA Club World Cup, due to take place in June and July 2021, was postponed. On 23 April 2020, UEFA confirmed that the tournament would still be known as UEFA Euro 2020.

Spectator plans and venue changes
In May 2020, Čeferin stated that in principle the tournament would take place in the twelve selected host cities. However, he did not rule out the possibility of reducing the number of cities, as three hosts were unsure if matches could be held under the new schedule. The tournament venues and match schedule was reviewed by the UEFA Executive Committee during their meeting on 17 June 2020. At the meeting, UEFA confirmed that all twelve original host venues would remain as hosts for the tournament in 2021, and approved the revised match schedule. However, Čeferin stated in October 2020 that it was still possible that the tournament could be played in fewer than the planned twelve host countries. The following month, UEFA stated that it "intends to hold Euro 2020 in the format and the venues confirmed earlier this year and we are working closely with all host cities on preparations". It was also announced that each host was discussing with UEFA and local health authorities on whether the venue could host matches at full capacity, between 100% and 50% capacity, at 33% capacity or behind closed doors. Each host city was asked to draw up two or three plans from the four options. The restrictions could also involve only local spectators to be permitted at matches. A final decision on which scenario would be applied individually at each venue was originally to be made on 5 March 2021. In October 2020, it was announced that UEFA matches would be suspended from taking place in Armenia and Azerbaijan until further notice due to the 2020 Nagorno-Karabakh war. However, this did not affect the planning of Euro 2020 matches to be held in Baku. This restriction was lifted in December 2020 following a ceasefire agreement between the countries.

In a New Year's interview, Čeferin said, "Vaccination has started and I think we will be able to have full stands in the summer. For now, the plan is to play in all twelve countries. Of course, there are backup options in case a country has a problem. We are ready to organise competitions in eleven, ten or nine cities... and even only in one country, if necessary. However, I am 99.9 percent sure that we will have the European Championship in all twelve cities, as planned." On 27 January 2021, UEFA met with the host associations to discuss operational matters, and reaffirmed the tournament would be held across twelve cities. The deadline for hosts to submit their venue capacity plans was moved to 7 April 2021, with a final decision on host cities and spectators to originally be made by the UEFA Executive Committee on 19 April 2021. UEFA announced on the following day that Daniel Koch, the former head of communicable diseases at Switzerland's Federal Office of Public Health, would serve as the tournament's medical advisor on matters related to the COVID-19 pandemic. In February 2021, the Israel Football Association offered to stage some tournament matches in the country, which had a high rate of vaccination. However, this was turned down by UEFA, who reiterated their commitment to the twelve host cities. In a March 2021 interview, Čeferin said, "We have several scenarios, but the one guarantee we can make is that the option of playing any Euro 2020 match in an empty stadium is off the table. Every host must guarantee there will be fans at their games." UEFA subsequently stated that no host city would be automatically dropped should they decide to play matches behind closed doors. However, UEFA would need to consider whether it would make sense to play matches without spectators, or if these matches should be reallocated to other venues. That same month, British prime minister Boris Johnson offered UEFA to host additional tournament matches in England should any venues need to be reassigned.

On 9 April 2021, UEFA announced that eight of the original twelve tournament hosts confirmed their spectator plans, with stadium capacities ranging from 25% to 100%. Only Bilbao, Dublin, Munich and Rome had yet to submit their plans, with each host originally given an extension until 19 April 2021 to submit their venue capacities. On 14 April, UEFA announced that Rome had guaranteed spectators for the tournament, and was therefore confirmed as a venue. On 19 April, it was announced that another extension was given to the three remaining hosts until 23 April, when UEFA would make its final decision. Due to the need to finalise ticketing details, host cities would have until 28 April to decide on whether to leave their spectator limits unchanged, or to upscale their allowed capacities.

On 23 April, UEFA announced that Seville would replace Bilbao as tournament host, while the matches of Dublin would be reallocated to Saint Petersburg for the group stage and London for the round of 16. Due to the COVID-19 pandemic in the Republic of Ireland, the Football Association of Ireland was unable to receive assurances from the Government of Ireland and the Dublin City Council to allow spectators into the stadium. Meanwhile, the Royal Spanish Football Federation (RFEF) said the sanitary conditions imposed by the Basque Government to host matches in Bilbao were "impossible to comply with", and thus would not allow for spectators to be present. After being removed as hosts, the Bilbao City Council stated they held UEFA and RFEF "directly responsible for us not staging this sporting event and the unilateral cancellation of our contractual relationships", and threatened legal action for financial compensation.

Also on 23 April, UEFA announced that local authorities had guaranteed "a minimum of 14,500 spectators" for the matches scheduled in Munich, which was therefore confirmed as host of four games. However, both the regional government of Bavaria and the German interior ministry subsequently reiterated their position that there was no such guarantee, and admittance of spectators would depend on the actual pandemic situation at the time of the tournament. A few days later, UEFA president Čeferin backtracked in an interview with a German newspaper, denying that UEFA had demanded guarantees for games with spectators, and conceding that "the local authorities will decide before the games whether spectators will be admitted or not."

Semi-final and final venue

Wembley Stadium's hosting of both the semi-finals and the final was threatened over quarantine restrictions in the United Kingdom that fans and 2,500 VIPs would be subject to. The Puskás Aréna in Budapest was considered as an alternative venue, as Hungary would have no entry restrictions for travel within the Schengen Area and could host the matches at full capacity. A spokesman for the Hungarian Football Federation said the organisation was "ready to host any high-level football event". However, UEFA remained confident that Wembley could host the final, as the organisation and the UK government discussed quarantine exemptions, but did not rule out a change in venue. Minister Kit Malthouse said the government was doing "as much as we possibly can" to host the final, while prime minister Boris Johnson stated they would try to make "sensible accommodations" for UEFA while still prioritising public health. Italian Prime Minister Mario Draghi said the final should be held in Rome due to rising COVID-19 cases in the United Kingdom. The following week, it was reported that officials and executives travelling for the matches would not need to self-isolate, though they would be subject to restrictions and required to remain in "football bubbles".

Rule changes
On 31 March 2021, the UEFA Executive Committee approved the use of a maximum of five substitutions in matches at the tournament (with a sixth allowed in extra time). However, each team are only given three opportunities to make substitutions, with a fourth opportunity allowed in extra time, excluding substitutions made at half-time, before the start of extra time and at half-time in extra time. The use of five substitutes has been permitted by IFAB during the COVID-19 pandemic due to the resulting fixture congestion, which has created a greater burden on players.

At the start of April 2021, UEFA also said they were considering allowing tournament squads to be expanded from the usual 23 players, following calls from national team managers in case of a possible COVID outbreak in a team, as well as to reduce player fatigue caused by the fixture congestion of the prior season. On 27 April, it was reported that the UEFA National Team Competitions Committee had approved the expansion of squads to 26 players, subject to confirmation by the UEFA Executive Committee. On 4 May 2021, the executive committee confirmed the use of 26-player squads. However, teams still may only name a maximum of 23 players on the match sheet for each tournament fixture (of which 12 are substitutes), in line with the Laws of the Game. These 23 must include three goalkeepers. It was also announced that after each team's first match, goalkeepers may still be replaced due to physical incapacity, even if the other goalkeepers from the squad are still available.

Water breaks were permitted so that players could drink from their own personal bottles. Cooling breaks, first seen at the 2014 FIFA World Cup were also permitted for games played in higher temperatures.

Special rules due to COVID-19
On 4 May 2021, the UEFA Executive Committee approved special rules for the final tournament due to the COVID-19 pandemic in Europe:
 If a group of players of a team were placed into mandatory quarantine or self-isolation following a decision from national or local health officials due to positive SARS-CoV-2 tests, the match will go ahead as scheduled as long as the team had at least 13 players available (including at least one goalkeeper). If fewer than 13 players were available (including at least one goalkeeper), additional players could have been called up to meet the minimum of 13 players required. In such a case, an equivalent number of quarantined players must have been definitively withdrawn from the 26-player list.
 If a team cannot field the minimum required number of players due to positive SARS-CoV-2 tests, the match may be rescheduled within the next 48 hours of the original date of the match by the UEFA administration, subject to viable rescheduling options being available. Additionally, UEFA may reassign the rescheduled match to an alternative venue if deemed appropriate.
 If the match cannot be rescheduled, the UEFA Control, Ethics and Disciplinary Body will decide on the matter. The team responsible for the match not taking place are considered to have forfeited the match and lost 3–0.
 If any member of the appointed referee team has to be replaced due to positive SARS-CoV-2 test, UEFA can exceptionally appoint a match official of the same nationality as one of the teams or not on the FIFA list.

Qualification

There was no automatic qualifying berth, and all 55 UEFA national teams, including the twelve national teams whose countries were selected to stage matches, had to compete in the qualifiers for the 24 places at the finals tournament. As the host cities were appointed by UEFA in September 2014, before the qualifiers, it was possible for the national teams from the host cities to fail to qualify for the finals tournament. The qualifying draw was held on 2 December 2018 at the Convention Centre Dublin in Dublin, Ireland.

The main qualifying process started in March 2019, instead of immediately in September 2018 following the 2018 FIFA World Cup, and ended in November 2019. The format remained largely the same, although only 20 of the 24 spots for the finals tournament were decided from the main qualifying process, leaving four spots still to be decided. Following the admission of Kosovo to UEFA in May 2016, it was announced that the 55 members at the time would be drawn into ten groups after the completion of the UEFA Nations League (five groups of five teams and five groups of six teams, with the four participants of the UEFA Nations League Finals guaranteed to be drawn into groups of five teams), with the top two teams in each group qualifying. The qualifiers were played on double matchdays in March, June, September, October and November 2019.

With the creation of the UEFA Nations League starting in 2018, the 2018–19 UEFA Nations League was linked with Euro qualifying, providing teams another chance to qualify for the tournament. Four teams from each division that had not already qualified for the European Championship competed in the play-offs for each division. The winners of the play-offs for each division, which were decided by two one-off semi-finals (the best-ranked team vs. the lowest-ranked team, and the second-best-ranked team vs. the third-best-ranked team, played at home of higher-ranked teams) and a one-off final (with the venue drawn in advance between the two semi-finals winners), joined the 20 teams that had already qualified for the tournament.

Qualified teams
Of the 24 teams that qualified for the tournament, 19 were returning from the 2016 edition. Among them were Belgium and Italy, who both had recorded flawless qualifying campaigns (ten wins in ten matches), defending European champions Portugal and world champions France, with Germany also qualifying for a record 13th straight European Championship. Finland and North Macedonia made their European Championship debuts, having never previously qualified for a major tournament. Scotland, a co-host of the tournament, qualified for their first major international tournament since the 1998 FIFA World Cup, and their first European Championship since 1996. The Netherlands and Denmark returned after missing out in 2016, with the Dutch featuring in a major tournament for the first time since the 2014 FIFA World Cup. For the first time, Austria, Hungary, Slovakia and Wales reached successive European Championship tournaments. Greece, winners in 2004, were the only former champions that failed to qualify, missing their second straight European Championship and third consecutive major tournament. Albania, Iceland, Northern Ireland, the Republic of Ireland and Romania failed to qualify after appearing in the 2016 finals.

Nine out of eleven host countries managed to qualify for the final tournament. Denmark, England, Germany, Italy, the Netherlands, Russia and Spain all qualified directly, while Hungary and Scotland qualified only after winning their respective play-off path. Azerbaijan and Romania failed to qualify, with Azerbaijan failing to qualify from the group stage and Romania losing in the play-off.

Venues
The 13 original venues were selected and announced by UEFA on 19 September 2014. However, the UEFA Executive Committee removed Brussels as a host city on 7 December 2017 due to delays with the building of Eurostadium. The four matches (three group stage, one round of 16) initially scheduled to be held in Brussels were reallocated to Wembley Stadium in London. On 23 April 2021, UEFA announced that due to a lack of guarantees regarding spectators caused by the COVID-19 pandemic, Aviva Stadium in Dublin was removed as a tournament host. Their four matches were reallocated to Krestovsky Stadium in Saint Petersburg for the three group stage matches, and Wembley Stadium in London for the round of 16 fixture. Similarly, UEFA reassigned the four matches in Spain elsewhere in the country, with La Cartuja in Seville replacing San Mamés in Bilbao.

On 7 December 2017, it was also announced that the opening match would take place at the Stadio Olimpico in Rome, chosen ahead of Amsterdam, Glasgow and Saint Petersburg. UEFA decided that if they qualified, the opening match would feature Italy.

Of the eleven selected cities and countries, seven cities and six countries had never hosted a European Championship finals match before. Seville was not a venue when Spain hosted the 1964 European Nations' Cup, and none of Azerbaijan, Denmark, Hungary, Romania, Russia or Scotland had hosted the tournament previously. Of the eleven selected stadiums, only two had hosted a European Championship match before: the Stadio Olimpico (1968 and 1980) and the Johan Cruyff Arena (2000). The original Wembley stadium hosted games and the final in UEFA Euro 1996, but although it stood on the same site, this was classified as a different stadium to the current Wembley Stadium.

Each city hosted three group stage matches and one match in the round of 16 or quarter-finals, with the exception of Saint Petersburg, which hosted six group stage matches, and London, which hosted host two matches in the round of 16. The match allocation for the eleven stadiums is as follows:
 Group stage, round of 16, semi-finals and final: London (England)
 Group stage and quarter-finals: Baku (Azerbaijan), Munich (Germany), Rome (Italy), Saint Petersburg (Russia)
 Group stage and round of 16: Amsterdam (Netherlands), Bucharest (Romania), Budapest (Hungary), Copenhagen (Denmark), Glasgow (Scotland), Seville (Spain)

Group stage hosts
The host cities were divided into six pairings, established on the basis of sporting strength (assuming all host teams qualify), geographical considerations and security/political constraints. The pairings were allocated to groups by means of a random draw on 7 December 2017. Each qualified host country played a minimum of two matches at home. The following group venue pairings were announced:
 Group A: Rome (Italy) and Baku (Azerbaijan)
 Group B: Saint Petersburg (Russia) and Copenhagen (Denmark)
 Group C: Amsterdam (Netherlands) and Bucharest (Romania)
 Group D: London (England) and Glasgow (Scotland)
 Group E: Originally Bilbao (Spain) and Dublin (Republic of Ireland)
 Later changed to Seville (Spain) and Saint Petersburg (Russia)
 Group F: Munich (Germany) and Budapest (Hungary)

The following criteria applied to define the home matches of host teams within the same group:
 If both host teams qualified directly or both advanced to the play-offs, a draw determined which team would play all three group stage matches at home (including the head-to-head match), and which one played only two matches at home.
 If one host team qualified directly, and the other failed to also directly qualify, the directly qualified host team played all three group stage matches at home, and the other host, if qualified, would play only two.
 If one host team advanced to the play-offs, and the other was eliminated entirely, the host team in the play-offs, if qualified, had played all three group stage matches at home.
 No action was necessary should both host teams failed to have qualified.

If a host team in the play-offs failed to qualify, the path winner would take the spot of the host in the match schedule and therefore would play the two or three matches based on the above criteria in the host city of the respective host that failed to qualify. The draw took place on 22 November 2019, 12:00 CET, at the UEFA headquarters in Nyon, Switzerland (along with the draw for the play-offs). In the draw, which was only necessary for Group B (Denmark and Russia), two balls were prepared, with the first drawn hosting the three matches.

Spectator limits
Due to the COVID-19 pandemic and the resulting restrictions on public gatherings, many of the venues at the tournament were unable to operate at full capacity. UEFA asked each host to devise a spectator plan in conjunction with their local/national government and health authorities. The hosts were given a deadline of 7 April 2021 to communicate their plans with UEFA. On 9 April, UEFA announced that eight of the tournament hosts had confirmed their stadium capacities, ranging from 25% to 100%. The remaining four hosts (Bilbao, Dublin, Munich and Rome) were given an extension until 23 April to submit their venue capacities. On 14 April, UEFA announced that Rome had also confirmed its venue capacity. On 23 April, the venue capacity for Munich was also confirmed, while Bilbao was replaced by Seville, which could guarantee spectators. In addition, Dublin was removed as a host, as it was unable to ensure spectators could attend.

Many of the matches did not see stadiums filled to their allowed capacity, with only Netherlands group stage matches that were played at the Johan Cruyff Arena seeing the stadium come within less than a thousand seats of being full. The match between England and Croatia saw an attendance of 18,497, compared to the allowed capacity of 22,500, with UEFA suggesting quarantine restrictions as the cause for the smaller attendance.

Team base camps
Each team chose a "team base camp" for its stay between the matches. The teams trained and resided in these locations throughout the tournament, travelling to games staged away from their bases. Unlike previous tournaments, each team could set up their base camp anywhere due to the pan-European format, without any obligation of staying in any of the host countries.

The base camps selected by the 20 directly qualified teams were announced by UEFA on 27 January 2020. The base camps of the remaining teams qualified via the play-offs were announced in 2021.

Final draw
The draw for the final tournament was held on 30 November 2019, 18:00 CET (19:00 local time, EET) at Romexpo in Bucharest, Romania. The 24 teams were drawn into six groups of four. The identity of the four play-off teams were not known at the time of the draw and were identified as play-off winners A to D. Should there have been groups that could not be finalised at the time of the final tournament draw, another draw would have been held after the play-offs on 1 April 2020, but UEFA confirmed the additional draw was not necessary after the identity of the 20 directly qualified teams and the 16 play-offs teams was known.

The teams were seeded in accordance with the European Qualifiers overall ranking based on their results in UEFA Euro 2020 qualifying. The following was the standard composition of the draw pots:
 Pot 1: Group winners ranked 1–6
 Pot 2: Group winners ranked 7–10, group runners-up ranked 1–2 (11–12 overall)
 Pot 3: Group runners-up ranked 3–8 (13–18 overall)
 Pot 4: Group runners-up ranked 9–10 (19–20 overall), play-off winners A–D (identity unknown at the time of the draw)

As two host teams from the same group could not be in the same seeding pot, the UEFA Emergency Panel would have either switched one host team with the lowest-ranked team of the higher pot, or switched one host team with the highest-ranked team of the lower pot (based on the principle that the move would have minimal impact on the original seeding). However, no seeding adjustments were necessary.

The draw started with Pot 1 and completed with Pot 4, from where a team was drawn and assigned to the first available group. The position in the group (for the determination of the match schedule) was then drawn. In the draw, the following conditions applied (including for teams that could still qualify via the play-offs):
 Automatic group assignments: Host teams were automatically assigned to their group based on the host city pairings.
 Prohibited clashes: For political reasons, UEFA set pairs of teams that were considered prohibited clashes. In addition to being unable to be drawn into the same group, non-host teams were prevented from being drawn into a group hosted by a country they clash with, even should the host not qualify. Only one prohibited clash, Russia / Ukraine, applied during the group stage draw. Other prohibited clashes among qualified and play-off teams were Kosovo / Bosnia and Herzegovina and Kosovo / Serbia, but the teams in these pairs were all in the play-offs and in Pot 4 for the draw, and would not be in the same group; Kosovo / Russia was also prohibited, but they also would not be in the same group due to play-off path pairings necessary for host allocation. However, these prohibited clashes are not excluded for the knockout phase.

Play-off path group allocation
Due to the format of the play-offs, which made anticipating all possible scenarios impossible, the UEFA administration had to wait to solve issues relating to the final tournament draw until the completion of the qualifying group stage. It was not possible for UEFA to prevent one of the play-off paths from containing two host teams, resulting in Romania (Group C hosts) and Hungary (Group F hosts) being drawn together in Path A. Therefore, the winner of this play-off path needed to be assigned two groups in the final tournament draw. To allow for this, Path A was paired with Path D (which does not contain a host), therefore providing a clear scenario for each possible qualified team. A draw took place on 22 November 2019, 12:00 CET, at the UEFA headquarters in Nyon, Switzerland (along with the play-offs draw), which decided on the order of priority for the allocation of Path A to the final tournament groups.

Two balls were prepared containing the names of the two groups hosted by the teams in question (Group C and Group F for Romania and Hungary, respectively). The first ball drawn determined the group ("priority group") that was allocated to Path A, with the exception of the host team of the second ball drawn ("non-priority group") winning Path A. In the draw, Group F was selected as the priority group, resulting in the following possible outcomes:
 Path A is won by Bulgaria, Hungary or Iceland: The winner of Path A will enter Group F, and the winner of Path D will enter Group C. (As Romania lost in the semi-finals of the play-offs, this was the resulting group assignment.)
 Path A is won by Romania: Romania will enter Group C, and the winner of Path D will enter Group F.

Seeding
The following was the composition of the pots, with teams divided and seeded as per their European Qualifiers overall ranking:

Draw results and group fixtures
The draw resulted in the following groups (teams in italics are play-off winners whose identity was not known at the time of the draw):

The fixtures for the group stage were decided based on the draw results, as follows:

Note: Positions for scheduling did not use the seeding pots, and instead used the draw positions, e.g. Team 1 was not necessarily the team from Pot 1 in the draw.

Squads

To lessen the load on players due to the COVID-19 pandemic, and in case of an outbreak within a team, squad sizes were increased from 23 (used at every European Championship since 2004) to 26. However, the maximum number of players permitted on the match sheet for each tournament fixture remained 23. Each nation's squad, which had to include three goalkeepers, was submitted at least ten days before the opening match of the tournament (by 1 June 2021). If a player became injured or ill severely enough to prevent his participation in the tournament before his team's first match, he could be replaced by another player; however, goalkeepers could still be replaced after their team's first match due to physical incapacity.

Match officials
On 27 September 2018, the UEFA Executive Committee approved the use of the video assistant referee (VAR) system for the first time at the UEFA European Championship. On 12 February 2020, UEFA and CONMEBOL signed a memorandum of understanding to enhance collaboration, including the possibility of a team of South American match officials appointed for the group stage of the tournament.

On 21 April 2021, UEFA announced the 19 refereeing teams for the tournament. This included Argentine referee Fernando Rapallini and his assistants, who were the first South American officials to be selected for the European Championship as part of UEFA's referee exchange programme with CONMEBOL. A group of Spanish officials were similarly selected for the 2021 Copa América.

A refereeing team of nine officials was appointed for each match. The team of five at the stadium consisted of a referee, two assistant referees, a fourth official and a reserve assistant referee. In addition, four video match officials were located at UEFA's headquarters in Nyon, Switzerland. This team consisted of a video assistant referee (the lead video official who was the main point of contact with the referee), an assistant video assistant referee (AVAR 1, who concentrated on following the match), an offside VAR (AVAR 2, who reviewed all potential offside situations) and a support VAR (AVAR 3, who acted in a coordination capacity). The tournament used the 2021 Laws of the Game, which came into force on 1 July but could be introduced in competitions that began immediately beforehand.

In addition, UEFA announced 22 video match officials and twelve support match officials (who acted as fourth official or reserve assistant referee). This included support referee Stéphanie Frappart, the first female official at the UEFA European Championship finals.

Opening ceremony
The opening ceremony took place at the Stadio Olimpico in Rome, Italy, on 11 June 2021 at 20:35 (CEST) prior to the first match of the tournament. Italian opera tenor Andrea Bocelli performed the song "Nessun dorma". Martin Garrix, Bono and the Edge also featured, performing the tournament's official anthem, "We Are the People". The performance was a virtual one amid the COVID-19 pandemic in Europe and was filmed at motion-control studios in London and at the Stadio Olimpico to recreate the stadium environment in 3D.

Group stage

UEFA announced the original tournament schedule on 24 May 2018, which only included kick-off times for the opening match and quarter-finals onward. The kick-off times of the remaining group stage and round of 16 matches were announced on 30 November 2019 following the final draw. On 17 June 2020, UEFA announced the revised match schedule for the tournament in 2021. All match dates, kick-off times and venues remained identical, but shifted one day earlier so matches would remain on the same day of the week (i.e. from 12 to 11 June for the opening match to remain on a Friday). On 23 April 2021, UEFA revised the venue assignments of the match schedule after one stadium was removed from the tournament and another was replaced.

Group winners, runners-up, and the best four third-placed teams advanced to the round of 16.

Times are CEST (UTC+2), as listed by UEFA. If the venue was located in a different time zone, the local time is also given.

Tiebreakers
If two or more teams were equal on points on completion of the group matches, the following tie-breaking criteria were applied:
 Higher number of points obtained in the matches played between the teams in question;
 Superior goal difference resulting from the matches played between the teams in question;
 Higher number of goals scored in the matches played between the teams in question;
 If, after having applied criteria 1 to 3, teams still had an equal ranking, criteria 1 to 3 were reapplied exclusively to the matches between the teams who were still level to determine their final rankings. If this procedure did not lead to a decision, criteria 5 to 10 applied;
 Superior goal difference in all group matches;
 Higher number of goals scored in all group matches;
 Higher number of wins in all group matches;
 If on the last round of the group stage, two teams were facing each other and each had the same number of points, as well as the same number of goals scored and conceded, and the score finished level in their match, their ranking was determined by a penalty shoot-out. (This criterion was not used if more than two teams had the same number of points.);
 Lower disciplinary points total in all group matches (1 point for a single yellow card, 3 points for a red card as a consequence of two yellow cards, 3 points for a direct red card, 4 points for a yellow card followed by a direct red card);
 Higher position in the European Qualifiers overall ranking.
Notes

Group A

Group B

Group C

Group D

Group E

Group F

Ranking of third-placed teams

Knockout phase

In the knockout phase, if a match was level at the end of normal playing time, extra time was played (two periods of 15 minutes each), with each team being allowed to make a sixth substitution. If still tied after extra time, the match was decided by a penalty shoot-out.

As with every tournament since UEFA Euro 1984, there was no third place play-off.

Times is CEST (UTC+2), as listed by UEFA. If the venue was located in a different time zone, the local time is also given.

Bracket

Round of 16

Quarter-finals

Semi-finals

Final

Statistics

Goalscorers

Awards

UEFA Team of the Tournament

UEFA's technical observer team was given the objective of naming a team of the best eleven players from the tournament. Five players from the winning Italian squad were named in the team.

Player of the Tournament

The Player of the Tournament award was given to Gianluigi Donnarumma, the first goalkeeper to win the award, who was chosen by UEFA's technical observers.
  Gianluigi Donnarumma

Young Player of the Tournament

The Young Player of the Tournament award, open to players born on or after 1 January 1998, was given to Pedri, as chosen by UEFA's technical observers.
  Pedri – 

Top Scorer

The "Alipay Top Scorer" award, given to the top scorer of the tournament, was awarded to Cristiano Ronaldo, who scored five goals and recorded one assist. The ranking was determined using the following criteria: goals, assists, fewest minutes played and goals in qualifying.

Goal of the Tournament

The Goal of the Tournament was decided by online voting. A total 10 goals were in the shortlist. On 14 July 2021, after an open vote with over 800,000 entries, UEFA announced that Czech forward Patrik Schick's second goal against Scotland had been named the goal of the tournament.
  Patrik Schick (second goal vs Scotland)

Prize money
The prize money was finalised in February 2018. Each team received a participation fee of €9.25 million, with the winner able to earn a maximum of €34 million.

Discipline
A player was automatically suspended for the next match for the following offences:
 Receiving a red card (red card suspensions could be extended for serious offences)
 Receiving two yellow cards in two different matches; yellow cards expired after the completion of the quarter-finals (yellow card suspensions were not carried forward to any other future international matches)

Marketing

Logo and slogan
The official logo was unveiled on 21 September 2016, during a ceremony at the City Hall in London. The logo depicted the Henri Delaunay Trophy surrounded by celebrating fans on a bridge, which, according to UEFA, represented how football connects and unifies people.

Each individual host city also had their own unique logo. The rectangular logos featured the text UEFA EURO 2020 on the top, the city name above the text host city on the bottom (all in uppercase), the main tournament logo on the left and a local bridge on the right. Each logo existed in English, along with variations in the local language when applicable. The logos were unveiled from September 2016 to January 2017.

The official slogan of the tournament was "Live It. For Real." The slogan was meant to encourage fans to see the matches live in the stadiums across Europe.

Match ball

On 6 November 2019, UEFA announced that the "Uniforia" by Adidas would be the tournament's official match ball. Predominantly white, the ball featured black strokes with blue, neon and pink stripes, and had coordinates of twelve cities which hosted the finals (including Dublin and Bilbao, which were later removed as the host cities). The name was derived from a portmanteau of "unity" and "euphoria".

A special variation named "Uniforia Finale" was launched on 5 July 2021, to be used in both semi-finals and the final match. The ball had a silver base, a different colour arrangement, and Wembley Stadium's coordinates (51° 33' 21,5" N, 0° 16' 46,4" W) written on the ball.

Mascot

The official mascot of the tournament, Skillzy, was unveiled on 24 March 2019. The character was inspired by freestyle football, street football, and panna culture.

Official song

On 19 October 2019, Dutch DJ and music producer Martin Garrix was announced as the official music artist of the tournament. He produced the official song of the tournament, as well as the walkout music preceding matches and the television broadcast music. The official song, "We Are the People", featured Bono and the Edge from Irish rock band U2 and was released on 14 May 2021. It was first performed in full at a virtual opening ceremony at the Stadio Olimpico in Rome.

Video game

The game was released by Konami as a free DLC on eFootball PES 2020 in June 2020, and on the eFootball PES 2021 Season Update on launch day. It included the official kits and player likenesses for all 55 officially licensed UEFA teams. The update also included five out of eleven venues of the tournament, as well as the official match ball.

Sponsorship
UEFA had the following sponsorship partners:
 "National Team Football Official Sponsors": Alibaba Group (Alipay brand), Booking Holdings, FedEx, Gazprom, Hisense, and Volkswagen.
 "Euro 2020 Official Sponsors": Coca-Cola, Heineken, Qatar Airways, Takeaway.com, TikTok, and Vivo Mobile.
 "Euro 2020 Official Licensees": Adidas, Hublot, IMG, Konami, and Panini.

Broadcasting

The International Broadcast Centre (IBC) was located at the Expo Haarlemmermeer in Vijfhuizen, Netherlands.

Incidents and controversies

Ukraine kit
The team of Ukraine presented its shirt for the championship, decorated with a map of national borders, including Crimea. The peninsula was annexed by the Russian Federation in 2014 but is still considered part of its territory by Ukraine and the United Nations. The shirt carried the slogan "Glory to Ukraine! Glory to the heroes!" Russian Foreign Ministry spokeswoman Maria Zakharova said that it was a Ukrainian nationalist slogan that imitated a Nazi one. Russian Deputy Dmitry Svishchev called UEFA to intervene because the shirt was "totally inappropriate". UEFA said there was no dispute for the map of Ukraine, as it reflected the borders recognized by the United Nations, while it ordered the removal of the phrase, as "specific combination of the two slogans is deemed to be clearly political in nature, having historic and militaristic significance."

Collapse of Christian Eriksen
The Denmark vs Finland match in Group B was suspended minutes prior to half-time after Danish midfielder Christian Eriksen collapsed on the pitch after suffering a sudden cardiac arrest. He was given immidate cardiopulmonary resuscitation, then transferred to Rigshospitalet and stabilised, with the match resuming by the decision of the Danish team later that evening.

Following the match, the Danish team stated that it was unfair they had to decide to continue playing the match. Former Danish international Peter Schmeichel said that the Danish team had been given the options to finish the game that same day, finish the game the next day at 12 pm, or forfeit the game and lose 3–0. UEFA denied that either team had been threatened with a forfeit.

British broadcaster BBC received over 6,000 complaints over the UEFA video-feed broadcasting live images of Eriksen receiving CPR on the pitch. Eriksen was later fitted with an implantable cardioverter-defibrillator, and returned to playing with Brentford eight months later.

Marko Arnautović insult
In the Austria vs North Macedonia match on 13 June 2021, Austrian player Marko Arnautović insulted Macedonian player Ezgjan Alioski and his family after his goal to make it 3–1. Arnautović is of Serbian descent, and Alioski is of Albanian descent; both countries have been in conflict over Kosovo for decades. The Football Federation of North Macedonia lodged a complaint with UEFA after the game, demanding a clear penalty. The UEFA Control Committee then opened an investigation, Arnautović was banned from the next game by UEFA for "insulting another player", and was unable to play in Netherlands vs Austria, the group's second game.

Removing marketing drink bottles
At a press conference before Hungary vs Portugal on 14 June 2021, Cristiano Ronaldo removed Coca-Cola bottles from the table and then held a water bottle in front of the camera to highlight that water, healthier than Coca-Cola or soda drink, is his ideal drink; it was thought that Ronaldo's actions were behind the collapse of Coca-Cola market value, but it was later found it had nothing to do with it. After France vs Germany, France's Paul Pogba, a practising Muslim, moved bottles of non-alcoholic Heineken beer from the table at a press conference. After these two actions, UEFA spoke with each team participating in the European Championship, in which it pointed out the importance of sponsors. UEFA also said that if it happened again, then punishments would be given out to those players.

Greenpeace protest
In the run-up to the France vs Germany on 15 June 2021 in Munich, a man with a paramotor got stuck on a fixed rope during a flight over the Allianz Arena, fell into a descent, grazed the spectator stands, and landed on the pitch. In the action planned as a protest by Greenpeace against car manufacturer Volkswagen, in which only a large ball with a label was supposed to be thrown onto the field, two people in the stands suffered head injuries and had to receive medical care. The campaign provoked strong criticism due to the endangerment of viewers; UEFA criticised it as a "reckless and dangerous action" that could have had serious consequences for many people. The German Football Association (DFB), the Bavarian Prime Minister Markus Söder, and other politicians made similar statements, and Greenpeace apologised. A total flight ban was issued over the Allianz Arena for the duration of the European Championship. The Munich police are investigating the paramotor pilot for dangerous bodily harm, trespassing, and violation of the Aviation Act.

Captain's rainbow armband
In connection with Pride Month, the German team used related symbolism. Team captain Manuel Neuer wore a captain's armband in rainbow colours in a friendly against Latvia on 7 June and continued to wear the armband in Germany's subsequent games. An investigation by UEFA followed during the group stage of the tournament. They assessed the armband as a "team symbol for diversity" and "a good cause." UEFA decided not to impose a penalty because of the rule broken by Neuer, which obliges team captains to wear UEFA captains' armbands.

Illumination of the Allianz Arena in rainbow colours

Before the Germany vs Hungary group stage match on 23 June 2021, Munich City Council applied to UEFA to have the façade of the stadium illuminated in rainbow colours as a sign of diversity and tolerance. Since the project was understood as a protest against a law passed by the Hungarian Parliament that, according to its critics, restricts the "information rights" of young people with regard to homosexuality and gender transitioning, UEFA rejected the application with reference to its status as a politically and religiously neutral organisation. After initially approving the illumination of the stadium in rainbow colours, the German Football Association joined the UEFA position. The Mayor of Munich Dieter Reiter criticised these decisions and described the illumination not as a political measure but as what he called a sign of humanity and a symbol for the acceptance of equality between people. In contrast, the Hungarian Minister of Foreign Affairs Péter Szijjártó welcomed UEFA's decision "not to be involved in a political provocation against Hungary."

Numerous reactions from German political parties condemned the ban by UEFA. Nationwide, other football stadiums, such as those in Cologne, Augsburg, Frankfurt, Wolfsburg, Berlin, and Darmstadt, were to be illuminated in the rainbow colours. Munich illuminated the Town Hall, Olympiaturm, and the wind turbine right next to the football arena. In the Netherlands, the Erasmusbrug, Ziggo Dome, tower in Alphen aan den Rijn and several town halls were illuminated. In protest against the UEFA ban, several large German corporations also changed their company logos on social media sites to rainbow colours. This included BMW, Volkswagen, Deutsche Telekom, Siemens, Sparkasse, and HypoVereinsbank. CSD Germany announced that they would be distributing up to 11,000 flags, 5,000 cardboard boxes, and 4,500 stickers with the words "Don't Kick LGBTIQ Rights" to fans in front of the stadium. On 23 June, UEFA itself also changed their logo in social media to include a rainbow background, with a statement that "the rainbow is not a political symbol, but a sign of our firm commitment to a more diverse and inclusive society." As a counter-action, Gábor Kubatov, president of the Hungarian club Ferencváros and vice-president of Fidesz, called for stadiums in Hungary to be illuminated in the Hungarian national colours. In addition, Prime Minister of Hungary Viktor Orbán cancelled a visit to Munich in protest.

Confiscation of rainbow flag in Baku
On 3 July 2021, UEFA began an investigation after two fans had a rainbow flag confiscated during the quarter-final match between the Czech Republic and Denmark at the Baku Olympic Stadium in Azerbaijan. Photos emerged while the match was being played, showing two stewards taking a rainbow flag, waved in support of the LGBTQ+ community, being taken. In a statement, UEFA said: "UEFA never instructed stewards in Baku – or in any other stadium – to confiscate rainbow flags. We are currently investigating what happened and we will of course contact the UEFA delegate, UEFA security officer and local authorities to clear this up. The rainbow flag is a symbol that embodies UEFA core values, promoting everything that we believe in – a more just and egalitarian society, tolerant of everyone and UEFA has ensured that the flag was returned to the supporter."

England vs Denmark incidents
In the 104th minute in the England vs Denmark semi-final match, on-field referee Danny Makkelie awarded a penalty kick to England after adjudging Danish defender Joakim Mæhle to have fouled English player Raheem Sterling in the penalty area. Danish goalkeeper Kasper Schmeichel stopped Harry Kane's penalty kick, but Kane was able to score from the rebound. In a press conference shortly after the match, Danish coach Kasper Hjulmand expressed his dissatisfaction with the penalty decision, as well as the fact that there were two balls on the pitch when the foul was given. Non-English commentators such as Arsène Wenger, José Mourinho, and Dietmar Hamann criticised the penalty decision during and after the match, arguing that the penalty should not have been awarded when checked by VAR, while Roy Keane described it as "very, very soft". Former England forward Alan Shearer also described the penalty decision as "soft", and said he would be "pretty angry if that penalty was given against England", while former England full-back Gary Neville said: "If we're being fair, you'd be absolutely devastated if you lost to a penalty like that." Match official and current ESPN rules analyst Mark Clattenburg, who refereed the UEFA Euro 2016 Final, said he would not have awarded a penalty kick for a tackle of this sort "in such a key moment."

The Birmingham Mail claimed Denmark disrupted the English wall during a critical free kick that led to the opening goal of the match, and that Denmark's goal should have been disallowed as a result. According to the FIFA Laws of the Game, during a free kick, attackers must be within one metre from the defending team's wall, a rule that was violated by the Danish players who were accused of blocking goalkeeper Jordan Pickford's vision.

On 8 July 2021, a day after the match, UEFA opened a disciplinary case against the English Football Association over a laser pointed at Danish goalkeeper Schmeichel just before the decisive penalty, booing when the Danish national anthem was played, and use of pyrotechnics. The laser pointer first came to the notice of both the Football Association and UEFA in the first half of extra time but a search for the culprit was unsuccessful. The Football Association were fined £25,630 (€30,000) for the three offences.

Italy vs England incidents

Storming of Wembley stadium before final
On the day of the UEFA Euro 2020 Final between Italy and England, thousands of England fans gathered at Wembley Stadium throughout the morning and afternoon, which prompted the police to urge anyone without tickets to not travel there. Two hours before the final, footage showed hundreds of fans fighting with stewards and police as they attempted to force their way past barriers to get into the stadium. Around 400 people managed to gain access to the stadium, in block 104, without paying for a ticket. Huge crowds gathered in Leicester Square throwing bottles and other objects, and Trafalgar Square, where a ticketed fan zone was set up. As a result of the violence and disorder, a total of 86 people were arrested by police, 53 of which were made at Wembley stadium for a number of offences, including public order breaches, assault, drunk and disorderly conduct and criminal damage. 19 police officers were injured, including one who lost a tooth and another suffered a broken hand.

On 12 July 2021, a day after the final, the Football Association said it would conduct a full review into how people without tickets were able to breach security and gain access to Wembley stadium for the Euro 2020 final. On 13 July 2021, following the chaotic scenes, UEFA opened a disciplinary case against the Football Association for the invasion of the pitch by an England supporter, throwing of objects by supporters, disturbances during the Italian national anthem, and the use of pyrotechnics.

On 18 October 2021, UEFA punished the Football Association (FA) for the unrest at the final by ordering England to play their next UEFA competition match behind closed doors. UEFA also imposed a ban for a second game, suspended for two years, and fined the FA £84,560 (€100,000) for the lack of order and discipline inside and around the stadium, for the invasion of the field of play, for the throwing of objects and for the disturbances during the national anthems.

Online racist abuse after final

England football players Bukayo Saka, Jadon Sancho, and Marcus Rashford were subjected to racist abuse online after missing penalties in England's Euro 2020 final defeat by Italy. The three football players took the last three penalties, two of which were saved by Italy goalkeeper Gianluigi Donnarumma, during England's 3–2 loss on penalties on Sunday 11 July 2021, and were all immediately targeted with racist language and emojis on their social media accounts.

The Football Association condemned the racist abuse and said it was "appalled by the online racism" aimed at some players on social media. In a statement, it said: "We could not be clearer that anyone behind such disgusting behaviour is not welcome in following the team. We will do all we can to support the players affected while urging the toughest punishments possible for anyone responsible. We will continue to do everything we can to stamp discrimination out of the game, but we implore government to act quickly and bring in the appropriate legislation so this abuse has real life consequences. Social media companies need to step up and take accountability and action to ban abusers from their platforms, gather evidence that can lead to prosecution and support making their platforms free from this type of abhorrent abuse."

The Metropolitan Police began investigating the abuse and said on Twitter that the abuse was "totally unacceptable" and it would not be tolerated. British Prime Minister Boris Johnson, Leader of the Opposition Keir Starmer, and the Football Association president Prince William, Duke of Cambridge, also condemned the racist abuse.

Reception
The tournament was admired for its high scoring, with 2.78 goals per game a record for any European Championship since the introduction of the group stage in 1980. Two of the highest-scoring games at the European Championship occurred during the tournament. 18 goals scored across four group stage matches on 23 June 2021 were a tournament record, whereas 14 goals scored in the Croatia vs Spain and France vs Switzerland matches on 28 June 2021 made it the highest-scoring day in knockout stages and the second highest overall.

The "light touch" officiating was also well received, with a perception that referees aimed to keep play moving.

References

External links

 
 Official Technical Report

 
2020
Euro 2020
June 2021 sports events in Europe
July 2021 sports events in Europe
Association football events postponed due to the COVID-19 pandemic